Ed Slott (born August 5, 1954) is a financial expert in the United States.  He is an author and public speaker providing training in IRAs (Individual Retirement Accounts) and retirement distribution planning.  He has been a collaborative creator of three nationally aired Public Television Specials and is a practicing CPA (Certified Public Accountant) based in Rockville Centre, New York.

Ed Slott's Elite IRA Advisor GroupSM is composed of 500 of the nation's top financial professionals who are dedicated to the mastery of advanced retirement account and tax planning laws and strategies. Slott is a nationally recognized IRA distribution expert, best-selling author, and professional speaker.

Public training
Slott was named "The Best" source for IRA advice by The Wall Street Journal and called "America's IRA Expert" by Mutual Funds Magazine.  He is known to financial advisors for his public speaking and IRA training programs, including a 2-Day workshop titled Instant IRA Success and a year-long advanced IRA training membership group. Ed Slott's Elite IRA Advisor group and Master Elite IRA Advisor group are among the most respected and technically enhancing groups for financial advisors.

Public television
Slott is a consumer advocate through his three Public Television (PBS) Specials, which stress to consumers the importance of working with competent financial advisors and educating them on the steps necessary to lower their tax burden now and forever and avoid needless penalties. His first Public Television Special, Stay Rich Forever & Ever with Ed Slott was the #1 fundraising special across America in 2008. Ed's latest public television program is “Ed Slott's Retirement Freedom!” (2022). This public television special educates viewers on key retirement savings strategies to have more, keep more and make their money last. In 2021, Ed recorded “Retire Safe & Secure! with Ed Slott” to communicate important updates about the SECURE Act to viewers nationwide. With his popular public television specials raising more than $65 million, he is one of the top pledge drivers of all time.

Other media
Slott is a resource to contemporary newspapers and media sources for reference and insight as an expert on taxation and individual retirement accounts in the United States.  Examples include The Wall Street Journal and the Chicago Tribune.  Ed Slott is also a columnist for AARP, the nation's largest nonprofit, nonpartisan organization dedicated to empowering Americans who are age 50 and older, reaching more than 38 million members with answers to important retirement-savings questions.

Books
Slott has written five books on retirement distribution planning and also writes and produces a monthly IRA newsletter for financial advisors and financial media professionals.

Ed Slott's Retirement Decisions Guide: 2022 Edition (2022)
The New Retirement Savings Time Bomb (2021)
Ed Slott's Retirement Decisions Guide: 2010 Edition (2009)
Taxing Away Your Wealth (a special report with Harry Dent) (2009)
Ed Slott's Stay Rich for Life!: Growing & Protecting Your Money in Turbulent Times (2009)
Parlay Your IRA Into a Family Fortune (2008)
The Retirement Savings Time Bomb and How To Defuse It (2008) 
Your Complete Retirement Planning Road Map (2007)

Awards and distinctions
Slott is a past chairman of the New York State Society of CPAs Estate Planning Committee and editor of the IRA Planning section of The CPA Journal. Slott is a past recipient of the Excellence in Estate Planning and Outstanding Service awards presented by The Foundation for Accounting Education. He is a former board member of The Estate Planning Council of New York City.

References

External links
 Ed Slott and Company, LLC Official Website

1954 births
Living people
American businesspeople
American finance and investment writers
People from Rockville Centre, New York